John C. Lefler (born March 18, 1975) is an American songwriter, singer, guitarist, and pianist. He is a former member of Dashboard Confessional.

Early history
Lefler is from Sugar Land, Texas. He attended Dulles High School and graduated high school in 1993. He attended the University of Texas at Austin and graduated in 1997 with a degree in fine art.

Lefler started playing guitar in 1989 and piano shortly thereafter. His first instrument was a PVT-60 which his father had purchased from a pawn shop. He started writing songs when he about 18 years old, after seeing the John Lennon bio-pic, Imagine. Lefler had piano lessons for a few months while in high school. "My recital piece was Bruce Hornsby's "The Way It Is". It was terrible. I've never had another lesson (or recital) of any kind since."  When describing his piano technique, he stated, "I tend to play the piano with my fists more than anything."

Career

Dashboard Confessional
Lefler joined Dashboard Confessional in 2002 after having flown out to meet the rest of the band in Florida. In less than two weeks, Lefler made his first official appearance as a Dashboard Confessional member on the MTV Unplugged recording. He left on his own accord after the band's hiatus began in 2010.

The Wimbledons
In 2005, Lefler and his brothers Bill and Kevin formed an alternative-country band called The Wimbledons in Los Angeles, California. After much infighting between the brothers, the band completed The Wimbledons EP on Lefler's own label, Goodhang Records.

Solo career 
Being influenced by bands like Jellyfish, Ben Folds, Crowded House, The Police, The Beatles, and U2, Lefler released Better By Design in June 2009. Better By Design was co-produced by Lefler, along with friends Salim Nourallah and Rip Rowan.

In 2012, he released his second EP, Shoutfire. It was produced by his brother Bill.

Captain and Camille 
Lefler began playing in a yacht rock tribute group Captain and Camille after a 70's night at Opening Bell Coffee. He formed the cover group with his friend Camille Cortinas as well as seven local Dallas musicians.

Personal life 
Lefler has a been an freelance graphic designer since 2012.

Discography
Dashboard Confessional – MTV Unplugged (2002)
Dashboard Confessional – A Mark, a Mission, a Brand, a Scar (2003)
Dashboard Confessional – Dusk and Summer (2006)
Dashboard Confessional – Shade of Poison Trees (2007)
Dashboard Confessional – Alter the Ending (2009)
John Lefler – Better by Design (2009)
John Lefler – Shout Fire EP (2012)
The Disappearing Act – The Disappearing Act (2010)

EP releases
The Wizerds (2003)
The Wimbledons (2005)

Featured guest appearances
 Rhett Miller – Rhett Miller
 John Ralston – Sorry Vampire
 Salim Nourallah – Beautiful Noise and Snowing in My Heart

References

American male singer-songwriters
American rock songwriters
Musicians from Houston
American rock guitarists
American male guitarists
American rock singers
1975 births
Living people
Dashboard Confessional members
People from Edmond, Oklahoma
University of Texas at Austin College of Fine Arts alumni
People from Sugar Land, Texas
Singer-songwriters from Texas
Singer-songwriters from Oklahoma
Guitarists from Oklahoma
Guitarists from Texas
21st-century American singers
21st-century American guitarists
21st-century American male singers